Rajya Sabha elections were held on various dates in 1973, to elect members of the Rajya Sabha, Indian Parliament's upper chamber.

Elections
Elections were held to elect members from various states.

Members elected
The following members are elected in the elections held in 1973. They are members for the term 1973-1979 and retire in year 1979, except in case of the resignation or death before the term.
The list is incomplete.

By-elections
The following by-elections were held in the year 1973.

References

1973 elections in India
1973